The Sentinelese, also known as the Sentineli and the North Sentinel Islanders, are an indigenous people who inhabit North Sentinel Island in the Bay of Bengal in the northeastern Indian Ocean. Designated a Particularly Vulnerable Tribal Group and a Scheduled Tribe, they belong to the broader class of Andamanese peoples. 

Along with the Great Andamanese, the Jarawas, the Onge, the Shompen, and the Nicobarese, the Sentinelese are one of the six native and often reclusive peoples of the Andaman and Nicobar Islands. Unlike the others, the Sentinelese appear to have consistently refused any interaction with the outside world. They are hostile to outsiders and have killed people who approached or landed on the island.

In 1956, the Government of India declared North Sentinel Island a tribal reserve and prohibited travel within  of it. It further maintains a constant armed patrol in the surrounding waters to prevent intrusions by outsiders. Photography is prohibited. There is significant uncertainty as to the group's size, with estimates ranging between 35 and 500 individuals, but mostly between 50 and 200.

Overview

Geography
The Sentinelese live on North Sentinel Island in the Andaman Islands, an Indian archipelago in the Bay of Bengal. The island is surrounded by coral reefs and has a tropical climate.

Appearance

They showed no signs of obesity and had very prominent muscles.

Population
No rigorous census has been conducted and the population has been variously estimated to be as low as 15 or as high as 500. Most estimates lie between 50 and 200.

The 1971 census estimated the population at around 82, and the 1981 census at 100. A 1986 expedition recorded the highest count, 98. In 2001, the Census of India officially recorded 21 men and 18 women. This survey was conducted from a distance and may not have been accurate. 2004 post-tsunami expeditions recorded counts of 32 and 13 individuals in 2004 and 2005, respectively. The 2011 Census of India recorded 12 males and three females. During a 2014 circumnavigation, researchers recorded six females, seven males (all apparently under 40 years old) and three children younger than four. A handbook released in 2016 by the Anthropological Survey of India on "Vulnerable Tribe Groups" estimates the population at between 100 and 150.

Practices
The Sentinelese are hunter-gatherers. They likely use bows and arrows to hunt terrestrial wildlife and more rudimentary methods to catch local seafood, such as mud crabs and molluscan shells. They are believed to eat a lot of molluscs, given the abundance of roasted shells found in their settlements. They are not known to engage in agriculture. Both sexes wear bark strings; the men tuck daggers into their waist belts. They also wear some ornaments such as necklaces and headbands, but are essentially naked. Usual habitations include small temporary huts erected on four poles with slanted leaf-covered roofs.

Sentinelese appreciate the value of metal, having scavenged it to create tools and weapons, and accepted aluminium cookware left by the National Geographic Society in 1974. There is no evidence of their having knowledge of metallurgy outside of cold forging to make tools such as arrow heads, though Andamanese scholar Vishvajit Pandya notes that Onge narratives often recall voyages by their ancestors to North Sentinel to procure metal. Canoes are used for lagoon-fishing, but long poles rather than paddles or oars propel them. They seldom use the canoes for cross-island navigation. Artistic engravings of simple geometric designs and shade contrasts have been seen on their weapons. The women have been seen to dance by slapping both palms on the thighs whilst simultaneously tapping the feet rhythmically in a bent-knee stance.

Similarities and dissimilarities to the Onge people have been noted. They prepare their food similarly. They share common traits in body decoration and material culture. There are also similarities in the design of their canoes; of all the Andamanese tribes, only the Sentinelese and Onge make canoes. Similarities with the Jarawas have been also noted: their bows have similar patterns. No such marks are found on Onge bows, and both tribes sleep on the ground, while the Onge sleep on raised platforms. The metal arrowheads and adze blades are quite large and heavier than those of other Andamanese tribes.

Language

Because of their complete isolation, nearly nothing is known about the Sentinelese language, which is therefore unclassified. It has been recorded that the Jarawa language is mutually unintelligible with the Sentinelese language. There is uncertainty as to the range of overlap with the Onge language, if any. The Anthropological Survey of India's 2016 handbook on Vulnerable Tribe Groups considers them mutually unintelligible.

Isolation and uncontacted status

They are a community of indigenous peoples in voluntary isolation. Designated a Particularly Vulnerable Tribal Group and a Scheduled Tribe, they belong to the broader class of Andamanese people.

Along with the Great Andamanese, the Jarawas, the Onge, the Shompen, and the Nicobarese, the Sentinelese are one of the six native and often reclusive peoples of the Andaman and Nicobar Islands. Unlike the others, the Sentinelese appear to have consistently refused any interaction with the outside world. They are hostile to outsiders and have killed people who approached or landed on the island.

The first peaceful contact with the Sentinelese was made by Triloknath Pandit, a director of the Anthropological Survey of India, and his colleagues on 4 January 1991. Indian visits to the island ceased in 1997.

History of contacts

Colonial period
In 1771, an East India Company hydrographic survey vessel, the Diligent, observed "a multitude of lights ... upon the shore" of North Sentinel Island, which is the island's first recorded mention. The crew did not investigate.

During a late summer monsoon in October 1867, the Indian merchant-vessel Nineveh foundered on the reef off North Sentinel. All the passengers and crew reached the beach safely, but as they proceeded for their breakfast on the third day, they were subject to a sudden assault by a group of naked, short-haired, red-painted islanders with arrows that were probably iron-tipped. The captain, who fled in the ship's boat, was found days later by a brig and the Royal Navy sent a rescue party to the island. Upon arrival, the party discovered that the survivors had managed to repel the attackers with sticks and stones and that they had not reappeared.

The first recorded visit to the island by a colonial officer was by Jeremiah Homfray in 1867. He recorded seeing naked islanders catching fish with bows and arrows, and was informed by the Great Andamanese that they were Jarawas. 

In 1880, in an effort to establish contact with the Sentinelese, Royal Navy officer Maurice Vidal Portman, who was serving as a colonial administrator to the Andaman and Nicobar Islands, led an armed group of Europeans along with convict-orderlies and Andamanese trackers (whom they had already befriended) to North Sentinel Island. On their arrival, the islanders fled into the treeline. After several days of futile search, during which they found abandoned villages and paths, Portman's men captured six people: an elderly man, a woman and four children. The man and woman died of illness shortly after their arrival in Port Blair and the children began to fall ill as well. Portman hurriedly sent the children back to North Sentinel Island with a large quantity of gifts in an attempt to establish friendly relations. Portman visited the island again in 1883, 1885 and 1887.

In 1896, a convict escaped from the penal colony on Great Andaman Island on a makeshift raft and drifted across to the North Sentinel beach. His body was discovered by a search party some days later with several arrow-piercings and a cut throat. The party recorded that they did not see any islanders. 

In an 1899 speech, Richard Carnac Temple, who served as chief commissioner of the Andaman and Nicobar Islands from 1895 to 1904, reported that he had toured North Sentinel island to capture fugitives, but upon landing discovered that they had been killed by the inhabitants, who retreated in haste upon seeing his party approach. Temple also recorded a case where a Sentinelese apparently drifted off to the Onge and fraternized with them over the course of two years. When Temple and Portman accompanied him to the tribe and attempted to establish friendly contact, they did not recognize him and responded aggressively by shooting arrows at the group. The man refused to remain on the island. Portman cast doubt on the exact timespan the Sentinelese spent with the Onge, and believed that he had probably been raised by the Onge since childhood. Temple concluded the Sentinelese were "a tribe which slays every stranger, however inoffensive, on sight, whether a forgotten member of itself, of another Andamanese tribe, or a complete foreigner".

Other British colonial administrators have visited the island, including Rogers in 1902, but none of the expeditions after 1880 had any ethnographic purpose, probably because of the island's small size and unfavorable location. M.C.C. Bonnington, a British colonial official, visited the island in 1911 and 1932 to conduct a census. On the first occasion, he came across eight men on the beach and another five in two canoes, who retreated into the forest. The party progressed some miles into the island without facing any hostile response and saw a few huts with slanted roofs. Eventually, failing to find anyone, Bonnington and his men left the island. Notably, the Sentinelese were counted as a standalone group for the first time in the 1911 census.

In 1954, Italian explorer Lidio Cipriani visited the island but did not encounter any inhabitants.

T. N. Pandit (1967–1991)

In 1967, a group of 20 people, comprising the governor, armed forces and naval personnel, were led by T. N. Pandit, an Indian anthropologist working for the Anthropological Survey of India, to North Sentinel Island to explore it and befriend the Sentinelese. This was the first visit to the island by a professional anthropologist. Through binoculars, the group saw several clusters of Sentinelese along the coastline, who retreated into the forest as the team advanced. The team also discovered raw honey, skeletal remains of pigs, wild fruits, an adze, a multi-pronged wooden spear, bows, arrows, cane baskets, fishing nets, bamboo pots and wooden buckets. Metal-working was evident. The team failed to establish any contact and withdrew after leaving gifts.

The government was aware that leaving the Sentinelese (and the area) completely isolated and ceasing to claim any control would lead to rampant illegal exploitation of the natural resources by the numerous mercenary outlaws who took refuge in those regions, and probably contribute to the Sentinelese's extinction. Accordingly, in 1970, an official surveying party landed at an isolated spot on the island and erected a stone tablet, atop a disused native hearth, that declared the island part of India.

In early 1974, a National Geographic film crew went to the island with a team of anthropologists (including Pandit), accompanied by armed police, to film a documentary, Man in Search of Man. They planned to spread the operation of gift-giving over three days and attempt to establish friendly contact. When the motorboat broke through the barrier reefs, the locals emerged from the jungle and shot arrows at it. The crew landed at a safe point on the coast and left gifts in the sand, including a miniature plastic car, some coconuts, a live pig, a doll, and aluminum cookware. The Sentinelese followed up by launching another volley of arrows, one of which struck the documentary director in his thigh. The man who wounded the director withdrew to the shade of a tree and laughed proudly while others speared and buried the pig and the doll. They left afterward, taking the coconuts and cookware. This expedition also led to the first photograph of the Sentinelese, published by Raghubir Singh in National Geographic magazine, where they were presented as people for whom "arrows speak louder than words".

During the 1970s and 1980s, Pandit undertook several visits to the island, sometimes as an "expert advisor" in tour parties including dignitaries who wished to encounter an aboriginal tribe. Beginning in 1981, he regularly led official expeditions with the purpose of establishing friendly contact. Many of these got a friendly reception, with hoards of gifts left for them, but some ended in violent encounters, which were mostly suppressed. Some of the expeditions (1987, 1992, et al.) were entirely documented on film. Sometimes the Sentinelese waved and sometimes they turned their backs and assumed a "defecating" posture, which Pandit took as a sign of their not being welcome. On some occasions, they rushed out of the jungle to take the gifts but then attacked the party with arrows. Other gestures in response to contact parties, such as swaying of penises, have been noted. On some of his visits, Pandit brought some Onge to the island to try to communicate with the Sentinelese, but the attempts were usually futile and Pandit reported one instance of angering the Sentinelese.

Wreck of the Rusley
In 1977, the Rusley ran aground off the north coast of North Sentinel Island.

1981 wreck of MV Primrose
On 2 August 1981, the MV Primrose, carrying a bulk cargo of chicken feed from Bangladesh to Australia, ran aground in rough seas just off North Sentinel Island, stranding a small crew. After a few days, the captain dispatched a distress call asking for a drop of firearms and reported boats being prepared by more than 50 armed islanders intending to board the ship. Strong waves prevented the Sentinelese canoes from reaching the ship and deflected their arrows. The crew of 31 men had to hold off the approaching Sentinelese with axes, pipes, and flare guns. Nearly a week later, the crew were evacuated by a civilian helicopter contracted to the Oil and Natural Gas Corporation (ONGC) with support from Indian naval forces.

The Sentinelese scoured the abandoned shipwrecks to salvage iron for their weaponry.

1991 expedition
In 1991, the first instances of peaceful contact were recorded in the course of two routine expeditions by an Indian anthropological team consisting of various representatives of diverse governmental departments, including female anthropologist Madhumala Chattopadhyay. This was the first time a woman was a part of a contact expedition with the Sentinelese.

During a 4 January 1991 visit, the Sentinelese approached the party without weaponry for the first time. They collected coconuts that were offered but retreated to the shore as the team gestured for them to come closer. The team returned to the main ship, MV Tarmugli. It returned to the island in the afternoon to find at least two dozen Sentinelese on the shoreline, one of whom pointed a bow and arrow at the party. Once a woman pushed the arrow down, the man buried his weapons in the beach and the Sentinelese approached quite close to the dinghies for the first time. The Director of Tribal Welfare distributed five bags of coconuts hand-to-hand.

Pandya comments:

Pandit and Madhumala took part in a second expedition on 24 February. The Sentinelese again appeared without weapons, jumped on the dinghies and took coconut sacks. They were also curious about a rifle hidden in the boat, which Chattopadhyay believed they saw as a source of iron.

In light of the friendly exchanges with the scrap dealers' team and Portman's observations in 1880, Pandya believes that the Sentinelese used to be visited by other tribes.

Later expeditions
The series of contact expeditions continued until 1994, with some of them even attempting to plant coconut trees on the island. The programmes were then abandoned for nearly nine years. The Indian government maintained a policy of no deliberate contact, intervening only in cases of natural calamities that might pose an existential threat or to thwart poachers.

A likely reason for the termination of these missions was that the Sentinelese did not let most of the post-Pandit contact teams get near them. The teams usually waited until the armed Sentinelese retreated, then left gifts on the beach or set them adrift toward shore. The government was also concerned about the possibility of harm to the Sentinelese by an influx of outsiders—a result of them projecting a relatively friendly image. Photos of the 1991 expedition were removed from public display and use of them was restricted by the government.

The next expedition was in April 2003, when a canoe built by the Onges was given to the visitors.

2004 tsunami
The expeditions counted a total of 32 Sentinelese scattered over three places but did not find any bodies. The Sentinelese responded to these aerial expeditions with hostile gestures, which led many to conclude that the community was mostly unaffected and had survived the calamity. Pandya argues that Sentinelese hostility is a sign of the physical as well as the cultural resilience of the community.

The Sentinelese generally received the post-tsunami expeditions in a friendly manner. They approached the visiting parties, which carried no arms or shields as they had in earlier expeditions, unarmed.

Killing of illegal fishermen adrift 

On 27 January 2006, Indian fishermen Sunder Raj and Pandit Tiwari, who had been attempting to illegally harvest crabs off North Sentinel Island, drifted towards the island after their boat's makeshift anchor failed during the night. They did not respond to warning calls from passing fishermen, and their boat drifted into the shallows near the island, where a group of Sentinelese tribals attacked it and killed the fishermen with axes. According to one report, the bodies were later put on bamboo stakes facing out to sea like scarecrows. Three days later, an Indian Coast Guard helicopter, dispatched for the purpose, found the buried bodies. When the helicopter tried to retrieve them, the Sentinelese attacked it with spears and arrows, and the mission was soon abandoned. There were contrasting views in the local community as to whether the Sentinelese ought to be prosecuted for the murder.

Pandya hypothesizes that the aggressive response might have been caused by the sudden withdrawal of those gift-carrying expeditions, which was not influenced or informed by any acts of the Sentinelese. He also notes that whilst the images of the hostile Sentinelese the helicopter sorties captured were heavily propagated in the media, the images of them burying the dead were never released. This selective display effectively negated the friendly images that circulated in the aftermath of the 1991 contact, which had already been taken out of public display, and restored the 1975 National Geographic narrative.

2018 killing of missionary 
In November 2018, John Allen Chau, a 26-year-old American trained and sent by the US-based Christian missionary organization All Nations, travelled to North Sentinel Island with the aim of contacting and living among the Sentinelese in the hope of converting them to Christianity. He did not seek the necessary permits required to visit the island.

On 15 November, Chau paid local fishermen to take him to a point  from the island's shore, then continued to the island in a canoe. As he approached, he attempted to communicate with the islanders and offer gifts, but retreated after facing hostile responses. On another visit, Chau recorded that the islanders reacted to him with a mixture of amusement, bewilderment and hostility. He attempted to sing worship songs to them, and spoke to them in Xhosa, after which they often fell silent, while other attempts to communicate ended with them bursting into laughter. Chau said the Sentinelese communicated with "lots of high pitched sounds" and gestures. Eventually, according to Chau's last letter, when he tried to hand over fish and gifts, a boy shot a metal-headed arrow that pierced the Bible he was holding in front of his chest, after which he retreated again.

On his final visit, on 17 November, Chau instructed the fishermen to leave without him. The fishermen later saw the islanders dragging Chau's body, and the next day they saw his body on the shore.

Police subsequently arrested seven fishermen for assisting Chau to get close to the island. Local authorities opened a murder case naming "unknown individuals", but there was no suggestion that the Sentinelese would be charged and the U.S. government confirmed that it did not ask the Indian government to press charges against the tribe. Indian officials made several attempts to recover Chau's body but eventually abandoned those efforts. An anthropologist involved in the case told The Guardian that the risk of a dangerous clash between investigators and the islanders was too great to justify any further attempts.

Notes

References

Bibliography

External links 
 Video "SENTINELESE : World's Most Isolated Tribe", includes clips of friendly contact by the Anthropological Survey of India as well as another clip of National Geographic crew's attempt at contact being rebuffed by the Sentinelese
 "Leave the Sentinelese alone", an interview with the T N Pandit of Anthropological Survey of India
 Madhumala Chattopadhyay: An Anthropologist's Moment of Truth, discusses first friendly contact with Sentinelese
 Administration in India's Andaman and Nicobar Islands has finally decided upon a policy of minimal interference 
 
 

Indigenous peoples of South Asia
Ethnic groups in the Andaman and Nicobar Islands
Hunter-gatherers of Asia
Uncontacted peoples
Scheduled Tribes of the Andaman and Nicobar Islands